The 1910–11 NC State Wolfpack men's basketball team represented North Carolina State University during the 1910–11 college men's basketball season.

Schedule

References

NC State Wolfpack men's basketball seasons
NC State
NC State Wolf
NC State Wolf